The 2008 Speedway Grand Prix was the 63rd edition of the official World Championship and the 14th season in the Speedway Grand Prix used to determine the Speedway World Champion. It was the second under the promotion of IMG.

Event format 
The format for 2008 was the same as that used in 2007 with 16 riders taking part in each Grand Prix. Over the course of 20 heats each rider raced against every other rider once.  The top eight scorers advanced to a semi-final and from each semi-final the first and second placed riders advanced to the GP final.

All rides count towards Grand Prix points totals, including the semi-final and final, which counts double (6-4-2-0) and therefore the maximum points for a single Grand Prix is 24 (five heat wins, semi final win and final win). This format means that the winner of each Grand Prix may not be the rider who scores most GP points from each race.

Qualification 
For the 2008 season, there were 15 permanent riders who were joined at each Grand Prix by one wild card and two track reserves.

2008 Riders

Cities 

 Bydgoszcz
 Cardiff
 Copenhagen
 Daugavpils
 Gelsenkirchen
 Gothenburg
 Krško
 Leszno
 Lonigo
 Målilla
 Prague

Calendar

The Final Classification

See also

References

External links 
 (en) SpeedwayWorld.tv - SGP news

 
2008
2008 in speedway